"In Some Small Way" is the fourth and last promotional single from Celine Dion's album, Miracle (2004). It was released on 7 March 2005 in the United States and Canada.

Background and release
"In Some Small Way", a pop ballad, was written by David Tyson and Richard Page, who also wrote "Sleep Tight" on the same album.

Dion performed "In Some Small Way" during her A New Day... show, between December 2004 and January 2005. She sang it as a duet with her backup singer Barnev Valsaint. She also performed it on The Tonight Show with Jay Leno in December 2004, with Valsaint and the gospel choir. The performance from A New Day... was to help raise money for the 2004 Indian Ocean earthquake victims.

There was no music video made for the song.

"In Some Small Way" reached number 9 on the Quebec Airplay Chart. It was also popular on the adult contemporary charts, peaking at number 14 in Canada and number 28 in the US.

Track listing and formats
US promotional CD single
"In Some Small Way" (Radio Edit) – 3:45

Charts

References

External links

Celine Dion songs
2005 singles
Songs written by David Tyson
Songs written by Richard Page (musician)
Song recordings produced by David Foster
2004 songs
Columbia Records singles
Epic Records singles